Alan Thomas (born 7 January 1947) is a former English cricketer.  Thomas was a right-handed batsman who bowled right-arm off break.  He was born at Bolton, Lancashire.
 
Thomas made a single first-class appearance for Lancashire against Oxford University at the University Parks in 1966.  Oxford University won the toss and elected to bat first, making 241 all out in their first-innings, during which Thomas bowled eight overs without taking a wicket, though he only conceded 7 runs.  Lancashire then made 203 all out in their first-innings, during which Thomas was dismissed for 4 runs by Richard Elviss.  In response, Oxford University reached 224/8 declared in their second-innings, leaving Lancashire with a target of 262 for victory.  However, they could only make 191 all out in their second-innings, during which Thomas was dismissed for a duck by Elviss.  This was his only major appearance for Lancashire.

References

External links
Alan Thomas at ESPNcricinfo
Alan Thomas at CricketArchive

1947 births
Living people
Cricketers from Bolton
English cricketers
Lancashire cricketers